The Porsche Sprint Challenge North America by Yokohama is a sports car racing series organized by German car manufacturer Porsche and sanctioned by USAC, with races in the United States and Canada. Porsche Motorsports North America (PMNA) intends this series as the step between club racing and the Carrera Cup North America as part of a hierarchy that includes the global Porsche Supercup.

The Porsche Sprint Challenge North America features semi-professional drivers racing head to head in matched Porsches in the largest single-make series in North America. Powered by one of the world's most successful race cars, the Porsche 911 GT3 Cup car, the multi-class structure of the series teaches drivers essential skills for an eventual career in the SRO GT World Challenge or WeatherTech SportsCar Championship.

Porsche Sprint Challenge North America is the first one-make racing step on the Motorsport Pyramid, a tier below the premier single-brand Porsche Carrera Cup North America Presented by the Cayman Islands. With the goal of moving drivers, teams and marketing partners from club level racing to a more professional and competitive environment, the series plays an intricate role in the growth and development of Porsche Motorsport.

There are three classes: the 992 class uses the Porsche 911 GT3 Cup 992, the 991 class uses the Porsche 911 GT3 991.2, and the Cayman class which uses the Porsche 718 Cayman GT4 Clubsport.

Due to the success of the North American series in 2021 Porsche Motorsport North America (PMNA) and the United States Auto Club (USAC) announced the formation of the Porsche Sprint Challenge USA West, a six-weekend season developed to provide race teams in the western United States and Canada a more geographically favorable travel schedule.

2022 Schedule 

*** Indicates GT3 Cup Only Event

** Indicates Cayman Only Event

Series winners

References

External links
 Porsche Sprint Challenge North America

Sports leagues established in 2021